Reuben Fenton (1819–1885) was a U.S. Senator from New York from 1969 to 1975. Senator Fenton may refer to:

Daniel G. Fenton (1812–1851), Wisconsin State Senate
William M. Fenton (1808–1871), Michigan State Senate